is a Japanese manga artist and illustrator. Koume studied at Kyoto University and has been drawing manga professionally since 2000. In addition to drawing series type manga, he also regularly produces erotic manga one-shots.

Works
Manga
War Does Not Have a Woman's Face
The Pollinic Girls Attack!
Kujibiki Unbalance
Spice and Wolf
Uta Kata
Vividred Operation
School Love Net

Games
Cannonball: Neko Neko Machine Mō Race!
Sapphism no Gensō

References

External links
Keito Koume's personal website 

Manga artists
Living people
Kyoto University alumni
Year of birth missing (living people)
Hentai creators
Hentai manga artists